The First Christian Church (now known as Frontline Church or Renaissance Center) is a historic church building at 1104 N. Robinson Avenue in Oklahoma City, Oklahoma. It was built in 1911.  The original First Christian church Oklahoma City moved from this location in December 1956.

It was listed on the National Register of Historic Places in 1984.

It was deemed significant for its architectural style, being deemed the "best example of an eclesiastical structure utilizing the Neo-Classical Revival style found in Oklahoma City."

It was built in 1910.  In 1983, it was being renovated, partly funded by tax credits.

References

Churches in Oklahoma
Churches on the National Register of Historic Places in Oklahoma
Neoclassical architecture in Oklahoma
Churches completed in 1911
Churches in Oklahoma City
National Register of Historic Places in Oklahoma City
Neoclassical church buildings in the United States